The 2001 Skopje protests in Skopje, FYR Macedonia, began after the evacuation of NLA insurgents during the Aračinovo crisis, involvement of the international community, and the halting of the Macedonian assault of Aračinovo. Around 5,000 Macedonians protested against the Government of Macedonia.

Storming the Parliament building 
On 26 June 2001, ~3,000 Macedonian protesters, armed with machine guns, broke into the Parliament building and demanded to talk to the President of Macedonia Boris Trajkovski, shouting "treason", calling for "resignation", and deriding Trajkovski's decision to allow the rebels to take their weapons when they retreated. Once in, they started to break windows and furniture, and destroyed two police cars. Macedonian flags were hung on balconies. Even the president's Mercedes-Benz was destroyed. Boris Trajkovski was evacuated after demonstrators broke into the Parliament building.

References 

2001 protests
June 2001 events in Europe